A Snow White Christmas is a Christmas animated television special produced by Filmation and telecast December 19, 1980, on CBS. The special is a sequel to the fairy tale "Snow White", unrelated to Filmation's other sequel to "Snow White" titled Happily Ever After (1989).

The film's plot revolves around the return of the Wicked Queen, who is unexpectedly brought back to life during Christmas and casts an evil spell that freezes the entire land. Only the young Snow White, the daughter of the original Snow White, manages to escape and take refuge with the seven giants with her dwarf friend. It is now up to the giants to defeat the Queen forever and save the kingdom.

Plot
After vanquishing the Wicked Queen, Queen Snow White and her husband King Charming are now the rulers of the land. They have a young daughter, also named Snow White for her snow-white hair. The royal family decides to host a Christmas winter sports festival. One of the participants is Grunyon, a bumbling dwarf and a friend of the young Snow White. Snow White says her Christmas wish is to build a playhouse for all the children and suggests remodeling the deserted castle on a mountaintop nearby that belonged to Snow White's evil stepmother.

However, a large ice block melts, freeing the Wicked Queen, who has been encased within it ever since her defeat. Returning to her castle, she finds her Magic Mirror still in place and conjures a magical ice storm that freezes the entire kingdom into an ice age, just barely missing princess Snow White who is told by her mother to find the Seven Dwarfs, immediately before her parents are transformed into ice statues. Grunyon, who was also spared being frozen, leads Snow White into the forest to escape the storm. After finding their way into the Warm Valley, they accidentally wander upon a giant garden and two giants appear (Finicky and Corny) who mistake them for bugs and try to squash them. Snow White starts crying, and Grunyon scolds the giants who apologize and introduce themselves through song, along with five other giants (Thinker, Hicker, Tiny, Weeper, and Brawny). Turns out they are cousins of the Seven Dwarfs. After hearing their story, they take pity on Snow White and Grunyon, and allow them to stay in their cottage.

After the Wicked Queen discovers the young Snow White is still alive and also more beautiful than her, she first turns herself into a giant rat to attack her, but is foiled when one of the giants shoos her away upon his return home. She then melts all the ice on the mountains to form a flood, which Brawny saves Snow White from. The giants decide to leave Snow White at home and post Hicker as a guard. The Queen turns two vultures into wyvern-like creatures to distract Hicker, then disguises herself as a giant old woman and tricks Snow White into smelling the scent of a poisoned flower that puts her to sleep, just as she had tricked Snow White's mother with the poisoned apple. However, Hicker's hiccups are loud and the other giants hear them and get back to the cottage.

Seeing Snow White apparently dead, they run off to attack the Queen's castle, seeking revenge. There, she tries to stop them by casting lightning bolts, but Brawny is too tough for it. She then summons seven demons to fight the giants, but Hicker begins hiccuping which causes an earthquake and the castle collapses. The Magic Mirror, revealed as the source of the Queen's power, is shattered and the demons vanish as she herself evaporates into nothingness. With the Wicked Queen's final demise, the curse she has placed over the kingdom is broken, causing the land to thaw and the ice statues to revert to people.

Grunyon and the Giants bring Snow White home to her parents in a rose-filled coffin. They kiss Snow White's cheeks and she awakens, and everyone rejoices. Brawny also tells that he and the other giants built a castle for the children while Snow White was asleep.

Cast
Erika Scheimer as Snow White II 
Melendy Britt as the Wicked Queen
Charlie Dell as Grunyon
Larry D. Mann as the Magic Mirror
Diane Pershing as Snow White
Clinton Sundberg as Thinker
Arte Johnson as Finicky, Corny, Tiny, Hicker, Weeper, Brawny

Production 
It was the first film produced by Lou Scheimer that featured his daughter Erika in the lead role. Filmation wanted to start making sequel to classic stories, and they chose "Snow White" since no one had made a film exploring what happened after the ending, and the format since it was easy to sell a Christmas special at the time.

While this is a sequel to the original fairy tale and not the 1937 Disney film, there are some similarities. One is the portrayal of the Magic Mirror's character, her also portrayed as a drama mask in darkness. In both films, the seven friends include a grim and taciturn individual who, despite seemingly not liking Snow White, ultimately leads the charge against the Queen who has disguised herself as an old woman and whom they chase up a cliff. As in the Disney film, a pair of vultures watch the Queen intently.

See also
A Snow White Christmas (musical)
Happily Ever After (1989 film)
List of Christmas films
The Snow Queen's Revenge

References

External links
 
 

1980 animated films
1980 films
1980s American animated films
1980s adventure films
American fantasy comedy films
Christmas television specials
Fiction about shapeshifting
Filmation animated films
Films about royalty
Films about witchcraft
Films based on Snow White
Animated Christmas films
1980s children's animated films
Fiction about resurrection
1980s English-language films
Films produced by Lou Scheimer